Lieutenant-General Sir Otto Marling Lund  (28 November 1891 – 15 August 1956) was a senior British Army officer who served as General Officer Commanding-in-Chief Anti-Aircraft Command.

Military career
Lund was educated at Winchester College and the Royal Military Academy, Woolwich before being commissioned into the Royal Artillery in 1911.

He served in World War I, taking part in the retreat from Mons, and after the War became Aide-de-Camp to Lord Rawlinson. After attending the Staff College, Camberley from 1924 to 1925 and tours with Eastern Command and Aldershot Command he became brigade major for the 2nd Infantry Brigade in 1928. In 1931 he joined the General Staff at the Staff College, Camberley
and in 1934 he became Military Assistant to Archibald Montgomery-Massingberd, the Chief of the Imperial General Staff at the War Office, where he remained as a General Staff Officer until the start of the War.

In World War II he was briefly Deputy Director of Operations at the War Office before becoming Major General Royal Artillery for the Home Forces and then Major General Royal Artillery for 21st Army Group. In 1944, after being replaced in his position by Meade Edward Dennis, he was made Director Royal Artillery at the War Office.

He was appointed General Officer Commanding-in-Chief of Anti-Aircraft Command in 1946; he retired in 1948. In the words of Richard Mead Lund, "played a key role in ensuring that the Royal Artillery met or exceeded all expectations."

He became Chief Commissioner of the St John Ambulance Brigade.

Personal life
Lund married Margaret Phyllis Frances Harrison and they had one son and one daughter. He died in London, aged 64.

References

Bibliography

External links
Record of visits to France and Belgium made by Lieutenant-General Sir Otto Marling Lund
British Army Officers 1939−1945
Generals of World War II

 

1891 births
1956 deaths
War Office personnel in World War II
British Army generals of World War II
Knights Commander of the Order of the Bath
Companions of the Distinguished Service Order
Royal Artillery officers
Anti-Aircraft Command officers
British Army personnel of World War I
Military personnel from London
People educated at Winchester College
Graduates of the Royal Military Academy, Woolwich
Graduates of the Staff College, Camberley
British Army lieutenant generals
Academics of the Staff College, Camberley